Abriaquí is a town and municipality in Antioquia Department, Colombia.

Climate
Abriaquí has a subtropical highland climate (Cfb) with heavy rainfall year-round.

References

 Regions of Antioquia - Abriaquí yesterday, Abriaquí today

Municipalities of Antioquia Department